Tandulwadi Fort is located near Saphale, 104 km north of Mumbai. Tandulwadi is not a fully built up fort, but a series of structures spread over the top of the mountain. The fort dates back 800 years and was primarily used as a watch tower over the surrounding plains. At a height of 1524 feet, it has views of the surrounding towns of Saphale, the Zanzorli lake, and the confluence of the Surya and Vaitarna rivers.

Location
The fort is located near Lalthane village in Palghar district, about 104 km from Mumbai, 75 km from Thane and 7.5 km from Saphale railway station. It is also reachable through the Mumbai - Ahmedabad Highway NH 8.  Upon reaching Varai Phata you have to take a left turn after crossing the bridge over Vaitarna river. A few minutes drive on this road and one can see the Tandulwadi fort on the front hillocks. Tandulwadi village is 15 km from the Varai Phata. There are no hotels or restaurants in the village except a few grocery shops. Tandulwadi village is well connected by road. Tandulwadi village is a small Varli tribal village. Nowadays Forest Department is making steps to go to the fort from Pimplapada (Lalthane). Lalthane waterfall situated just under the fort and is a popular attraction during the rainy season.

History
The first known history of the fort was in the 15th century (about 1429) during the rule of Jafar Khan, son of Ahmed Shah of the Gujarat Sultanate. It was used as a reconnoiter fort to keep a watch on neighboring forts and the Arabian Sea. In 1454, the Sultan of Ahmedabad captured Mahikavati (Mahim) and one of his Sardar named Mallik Allauddin was made chief of Tandulwadi fort. In 1509, the Portuguese took the fort after they wrested Diu from the Gujarat and established a stronghold at the nearby Vasai area, where they built the Vasai Fort. The Portuguese lost control of the area to the Marathas in 1737 after the battle of Bassein.

Hiking
Tandulwadi has a moderately difficult gradient and it takes about a half hours to reach the main plateau from Tandulwadi village which is situated at the base of the fort. To reach the highest point it takes another one hour. The height of the fort is about 1524 feet.

Upon reaching the main plateau, one can find several rock cut water cisterns. There are no bastions, walls or houses on the fort. There is no evidence of fortification except for a small stone wall on the southern side. A small water pond is situated in the center.

From the top of the fort are seen Kohoj fort, Takmak fort, Asheri fort, Mahalaxmi pinnacle and the Arabian sea.

Accommodation
There is no residing place on the fort. Overnight accommodation can be found in the primary school in the village.

Gallery

See also 
 List of forts in Maharashtra
 List of forts in India
 Marathi People
 Maratha Navy
 List of Maratha dynasties and states
 Maratha War of Independence
 Battles involving the Maratha Empire
 Maratha Army
 Maratha titles
 Military history of India
 List of people involved in the Maratha Empire

References 

Buildings and structures of the Maratha Empire
Forts in Palghar district
16th-century forts in India
Caves of Maharashtra
Tourist attractions in Pune district
Former populated places in India
Hiking trails in India

Hiking